Jorge Guerra (27 October 1913 – 28 July 2003) was a Chilean cyclist. He competed in the individual and team road race events at the 1936 Summer Olympics.

References

External links
 

1913 births
2003 deaths
Chilean male cyclists
Olympic cyclists of Chile
Cyclists at the 1936 Summer Olympics
Place of birth missing
20th-century Chilean people